S. M. Naqvi Gold Medal was instituted in 2013 by the Geological Society of India in the name of the late Syed Mahmood Naqvi, an outstanding scientist who contributed extensively in the field of Precambrian geology. He was associated with the Society in various capacities till his death in September 2009. The S. M. Naqvi Gold Medal will be awarded every two years to a scientist below the age of 60 years for outstanding contributions in any field of Indian Geology.

Medallists
Source: Geological Society of India
2013 Talat Ahmad and Arun Kumar
2015 R. P. Tiwari
2017 Birendra Pratap Singh, BHU, Varanasi

See also

 List of geology awards

References

Geology awards
Awards established in 2013
Indian awards